Rodrigo Vargas (born August 15, 1985), is a Mexican professional mixed martial artist who competed in the Ultimate Fighting Championship (UFC). He competes in the lightweight division.

Mixed martial arts career

Early career
Starting his professional MMA career in 2011, Vargas compiled a 11–3 record fighting most for regional Mexican promotions. In his last fight before the UFC, Vargas knocked out former UFC fighter Mike de la Torre in 18 seconds at Combate Americas: Mexico vs. The World on May 18, 2018.

Ultimate Fighting Championship
Vargas made his UFC debut against Alex da Silva Coelho at UFC Fight Night: Shevchenko vs. Carmouche 2 on August 10, 2019. He got outgrappled by Coelho throughout the fight and lost it via unanimous decision.

Vargas faced Brok Weaver at UFC Fight Night: Anderson vs. Błachowicz 2 on February 15, 2020. He lost the fight via DQ when Vargas kneed Weaver in the head while he was a grounded opponent.

Vargas was scheduled to face  Alan Patrick on September 12, 2020, at UFC Fight Night: Waterson vs. Hill, but Vargas was removed from the card in early September for undisclosed reasons and replaced by Bobby Green.

Vargas faced Rong Zhu at UFC 261 on April 24, 2021. He won the fight via unanimous decision.

Vargas faced Paddy Pimblett on March 19, 2022, at UFC Fight Night 204. He lost the fight via rear-naked choke in round one.

In May 2022, it was reported that Vargas was released from UFC.

Mixed martial arts record

|-
|Loss
|align=center|12–5
|Paddy Pimblett
|Submission (rear-naked choke)
|UFC Fight Night: Volkov vs. Aspinall
|
|align=center|1
|align=center|3:49
|London, England
|
|-
| Win
| align=center|12–4
| Rong Zhu
| Decision (unanimous)
| UFC 261
| 
| align=center| 3
| align=center| 5:00
| Jacksonville, Florida, United States
|
|-
| Loss
| align=center| 11–4
| Brok Weaver
| DQ (illegal knee)
|UFC Fight Night: Anderson vs. Błachowicz 2 
|
|align=center|1
|align=center|4:02
|Rio Rancho, New Mexico, United States
|
|-
| Loss
| align=center| 11–3
| Alex da Silva Coelho
| Decision (unanimous)
|UFC Fight Night: Shevchenko vs. Carmouche 2 
|
|align=center|3
|align=center|5:00
|Montevideo, Uruguay
|
|-
| Win
| align=center| 11–2
| Mike de la Torre
| KO (head kick)
| Combate Americas: Mexico vs. The World
| 
| align=center| 1
| align=center| 0:18
| Tijuana, Mexico
|
|-
| Win
| align=center| 10–2
| Danny Ramirez
| Decision (unanimous)
|Combate Americas 15
|
|align=center|3
|align=center|5:00
| Mexico City, Mexico
|
|-
| Loss
| align=center| 9–2
| Marco Antonio Elpidio
| Decision (split)
|Combate Americas 10
|
|align=center|3
|align=center|5:00
| Mexico City, Mexico
|
|-
| Win
| align=center| 9–1
| Ivan Castillo
| Submission (guillotine choke)
| TWC 25
| 
| align=center| 3
| align=center| 2:05
| Porterville, California, United States
|
|-
| Win
| align=center| 8–1
| Leon Lara
| TKO (punches)
| Coliseo Fight Series 6
| 
| align=center| 1
| align=center| 3:37
| Mexico
|
|-
| Win
| align=center| 7–1
| Juan Ramon Grano
| Submission (guillotine choke)
| Beat Down MMA 1
| 
| align=center| 2
| align=center| 0:31
| Toluca, Mexico
|
|-
| Win
| align=center| 6–1
| Antonio Arellano Gonzalez
| KO (punches)
| Jasaji Fighting League 7
| 
| align=center| 1
| align=center| N/A
| Tlalnepantla de Baz, Mexico
|
|-
| Win
| align=center| 5–1
| Jordan Williams
| TKO (doctor stoppage)
| TPF 19: Throwback Thursday
| 
| align=center| 1
| align=center| 5:00
|Lemoore, California, United States
|
|-
| Loss
| align=center| 4–1
| Jose Caceres
| Submission (reverse triangle choke)
| Combate Americas: Level vs. Arzeno
| 
| align=center| 1
| align=center| 3:08
| Miami, Florida, United States
|
|-
| Win
| align=center| 4–0
| Francisco Velázquez
| TKO (punches)
| Coliseo Gladiadores Black Samurai
| 
| align=center| 1
| align=center| 3:37
| León, Mexico
|
|-
| Win
| align=center| 3–0
| Alfredo Morales
| KO (punches)
| Xtreme Kombat 11
| 
| align=center| 2
| align=center| 0:37
| Mexico City, Mexico
|
|-
| Win
| align=center| 2–0
| Alejandro Saaveda
| KO (punch)
| Xtreme Kombat 7
| 
| align=center| 1
| align=center| 0:11
| Mexico City, Mexico
|
|-
| Win
| align=center| 1–0
| Mario Torres
| Submission (armbar)
| Xtreme Fighters Latino
| 
| align=center| 1
| align=center| 0:33
| Guanajuato, Mexico
|
|-

See also
 List of male mixed martial artists

References

External links
 
 

1985 births
Living people
Mexican male mixed martial artists
Lightweight mixed martial artists
Ultimate Fighting Championship male fighters